Duke and Mary Diggs House is a historic home located at Boonville, Cooper County, Missouri. It was built about 1869, and is a one-story, central hall plan, vernacular brick dwelling. It rests on rough cut stone foundation laid in regular courses and has a gable roof.

It was listed on the National Register of Historic Places in 1990.

References

Houses on the National Register of Historic Places in Missouri
Houses completed in 1869
Houses in Cooper County, Missouri
National Register of Historic Places in Cooper County, Missouri
1869 establishments in Missouri
Central-passage houses
Boonville, Missouri